is a Japanese yuri manga written and illustrated by sometime. Superwomen in Love! was serialized online at Yuri Hime @ Pixiv, the yuri manga magazine's official Pixiv platform. Before serialization it was published as a one-shot manga on the author's Twitter and Pixiv. It was licensed for an English-language release by Seven Seas Entertainment in 2020.

Plot 
Honey Trap, an Antinoid who wants to destroy humanity, finally has a chance to defeat the hero of justice, Rapid Rabbit. However just before she can claim victory, Honey Trap sees Rapid Rabbit's face without her mask for the first time, and instantly falls for her. Unable to fight, she is kicked out of the Antinoid organization but decided to team up with Rapid Rabbit to fight against them.

Characters 
Honey Trap
 She was once one of Antinoid army's top manager before switching sides to work with Rapid Rabbit. While she gives the appearance of being standoffish and cool, she is actually quite hopeless around Hayate since falling for her.

Honjo Hayate / Rapid Rabbit
 Hayate happened to pick up what seemed like an makeup item at a shopping mall in the neighboring town, but turned out to be the trigger for transforming her into Rapid Rabbit. She soon took on the mantel and began protecting her city from the encroaching Antinoid threat.

Publication

Reception 
Erica Friedman of Yuricon praised the series for being "a light-hearted romp in the tropes of Japanese costumed superhero television shows. It requires little knowledge or commitment but is a lot of fun." As well as noting that the lettering in the English release was superlative and that the translation lead to an authentic reading experience.

References

External links 
Seven Seas Entertainment's Superwomen in Love! Honey Trap and Rapid Rabbit official website
 

2018 manga
Ichijinsha manga
Seven Seas Entertainment titles
Superheroes in anime and manga
Yuri (genre) anime and manga